Ellen Jones (born 10 November 2002) is an professional footballer who plays as a midfielder for Coventry United in the FA Women's Championship on loan from Leicester City of the FA Women's Super League.

Club career 
She made her first team debut in the FA Women's League Cup as a 66th-minute substitute in a 4–2 win over Crystal Palace on 5 November 2020, and made her first appearance in the FA Women's Super League against Manchester City on 7 November 2020, again as a substitute, when she replaced Emma Bissell after 68 minutes.

In January 2023, Jones was loaned to FA Women's Championship club Coventry United.

International career
Jones has represented England U17 8 times.

Career statistics 
 As of match played 17 March 2021.

References

2002 births
Living people
Women's association football midfielders
Women's Super League players
English women's footballers
Bristol City W.F.C. players
Leicester City W.F.C. players
Coventry United W.F.C. players
England women's youth international footballers
Colorado Buffaloes women's soccer players
Welsh women's footballers